Kerdau (Pahang Malay: Keghda) is a mukim in Temerloh District, Pahang, Malaysia. This settlement in Kerdau, has been open since 1800. The name Kerdau was taken from the tree. In the past, this village was planted with Kerdau trees and this Kerdau tree is used as a decoration by local residence when dignitaries visit this area. Previously, Kerdau had been nicknamed as the city of cowboys because the row of traditional shops in the city still retains the identity of its 1940s even though the country is on the verge of more than 50 years of independence.

History
The old town of Kerdau became important at its time because from the 1930s to the 1970s the railway was the main communication needs of the people dealing at that time and this infrastructure available in Kerdau. Kerdau became more developed when the railway connecting Singapore to Gemas to Tumpat to Hatyai in Thailand was completed. Kerdau which is in between has a stopping station even when the Japanese invaded Malaya via Kota Bharu on 8 December 1941 and heading to Singapore, Kerdau became their route and stopover. In short, Kerdau was a famous town at their peak time in the past.

Nowadays
The city of Kerdau began to downcast when the government built a major road between Temerloh to Jerantut in 1970. When the journey became easier, the train was less popular and began to be forgotten. Unlike before, the express train no longer stops in Kerdau. Most residents also deal directly to the city of Temerloh rather than in Kerdau when the road has completed. Year after year changes can be seen in terms of development, education and facilities. The development of the modern house can be seen very clear. Education is also given serious attention for the future of the nation's children with the construction of schools in every village. The life of the people of Kerdau is also smooth and easy because it is equipped with the infrastructure of basic facilities provided by the government. Roads have been widened and fully paved, transportation facilities are easily available, Penghulu Office, ADUN Office, library, schools, clinics in the Kerdau area further facilitate to the residence.

References

Mukims of Pahang
Temerloh District
Towns in Pahang